Czechoslovakia competed at the 1988 Winter Paralympics in Innsbruck, Austria. One competitor from Czechoslovakia won 0 medals and finished 16th in the medal table.

Cross-country 

Pavla Valnickova competed in the Women's Short Distance 5 km B1 and Women's Short Distance 10 km B1 events. She did not win any medals. She finished in 7th and 8th place respectively.

See also 

 Czechoslovakia at the Paralympics
 Czechoslovakia at the 1988 Winter Olympics

References 

Czechoslovakia at the Paralympics
1988 in Czechoslovak sport
Nations at the 1988 Winter Paralympics